KFIA may refer to:

KFIA (AM), a radio station broadcasting in Carmichael, California
Korea Financial Investment Association, a South Korean non-profit, self-regulatory organization
King Fahd International Airport, abbreviated to KFIA, an airport in Dammam, Saudi Arabia